The Agent (Rick Mason) is a fictional character appearing in American comic books published by Marvel Comics. Created by James Hudnall and John Ridgway, the character first appeared in Marvel Graphic Novel: Rick Mason, The Agent #1 (December, 1989). 

O-T Fagbenle portrayed Mason in the Marvel Cinematic Universe film Black Widow (2021).

Publication history

Rick Mason was created by James Hudnall and John Ridgway and made his debut in Marvel Graphic Novel: Rick Mason, The Agent #1 (December, 1989).

Fictional character biography
Rick Mason served as a mercenary who specialized in the non-lethal handling of superhumans, having grown up exposed to advanced technology necessary for such tasks as the son of the criminal inventor Phineas Mason, better known as The Tinkerer.  

Mason became a highly trained covert operative due to the experience he gained working alongside individuals like Nick Fury, Dennis Nayland, and Alexi Vazhin. He decided to become freelance, adopting the codename "The Agent," and has completed missions for the governments of many nations, including the United States, Israel, Japan, and the United Kingdom.

Mason was once hired to kill an alleged mole code-named "Vitamin" from the Central Intelligence Agency in Berlin. In an attempt to kill him, Mason blew up a hotel, but he was under observation by Michael Rossi and Carol Danvers, who tracked him across the city. Mason escaped using one of his father's devices to become invisible.

His upbringing in New York City brought him into contact with many criminals due to his father's occupation. Ill at ease with wrong-doers, the Agent sought a path in life other than aiding others in perpetrating crimes. Becoming a mercenary the Agent worked for S.H.I.E.L.D. though was later hired by the British government to prevent the super team China Force from overthrowing their rule of Hong Kong. Returning to S.H.I.E.L.D., he was required by Nick Fury to undertake a similar mission in Costa Brava involving American-backed rebels. The Agent discovered that one of his former teachers, Teng Yun-Suan, was responsible for both of these incidents. Yun-Suan met death at the Agent's hands. As a freelance mercenary who specialized in non-lethal metahuman handlings, he assisted Nick Fury involving metahuman mercenaries.

The Agent remained on good terms with his father despite the latter making a living in a field he did not approve of. The Corporation used this to their advantage and kidnapped the Agent to force the Tinkerer to work for them. Mason encounters Luke Cage and Dakota North and the three defeat the Corporation. Unfortunately, Mason was apparently killed later on after which his activities as the anonymous Agent were public knowledge.

Mason's own son perished during Nitro's explosion in Stamford, Connecticut which heralded the Civil War's beginning.

Mason later teamed up with Carol Danvers, and the two learned about Ghazi Rashid now as a metahuman. After it's revealed that Rossi was Vitamin and Ms. Marvel gets overloaded with power, Mason almost dies from a bomb and only makes it out in time. He tracked Rossi to Brazil who he killed then spoke with Norman Osborn for his father's prison release, threatening death for Ms. Marvel's apparent death.

In other media 
 Rick Mason appears in Black Widow, portrayed by O.T. Fagbenle. This version is an ally from Natasha Romanoff's past with S.H.I.E.L.D. and a romantic interest. Additionally, Fagbenle described him as "a finder for people who aren't so affiliated with armies".
 Rick Mason appears in Spider-Man: Miles Morales, voiced by Todd Williams. This version was a Roxxon scientist, the older brother of Phin Mason, and friend of Miles Morales. While working for Roxxon, Rick helped create the Nuform power source until he and his staff were diagnosed with bone marrow failure. With Phin's help, Rick tried to expose the truth, but was trapped and killed by Roxxon's R&D director Simon Krieger, who subsequently took credit for Rick's work. Rick's death pushed his sister to seek revenge as the Tinkerer, resulting in a violent conflict between the Underground criminal group and Roxxon that Morales works to contain.

References

External links
 

Comics characters introduced in 1989
Fictional characters from New York City
Fictional mercenaries in comics
Fictional secret agents and spies in comics
Marvel Comics male superheroes
S.H.I.E.L.D. agents